Eucithara pusilla is a small sea snail, a marine gastropod mollusk in the family Mangeliidae.

Description
The length of the shell attains 4.5 mm.

(Original description) The oval shell has a white color, stained with purplish brown. The whorls are longitudinally ribbed with somewhat oblique ribs and striated transversely. The whorls are angulated at the sutures. The outer and inner lip are denticulated. The spire is short. The outer lip is thickened.

Distribution
This marine species occurs off Hawaii.

References

 Severns, M. (2011). Shells of the Hawaiian Islands - The Sea Shells. Conchbooks, Hackenheim. 564 pp.

External links
 
  Tucker, J.K. 2004 Catalog of recent and fossil turrids (Mollusca: Gastropoda). Zootaxa 682:1-1295.

pusilla
Gastropods described in 1860